Nicki Minaj is a rapper and singer based in the United States. After releasing three mixtapes between 2007 and 2009, Minaj signed a recording contract with Young Money Entertainment in 2009. Since then, she has released four studio albums—Pink Friday in 2010, Pink Friday: Roman Reloaded in 2012, The Pinkprint in 2014, and Queen in 2018.

In 2011, Minaj won two American Music Awards–one for Favorite Rap/Hip-Hop Artist and the other for Favorite Rap/Hip-Hop Album, for her debut album Pink Friday. She went on to win in both categories again the following year, with the "Favorite Rap/Hip-Hop Album" award being for her second studio album Pink Friday: Roman Reloaded. In 2015, Minaj won in the same categories again, with the "Favorite Rap/Hip-Hop Album" award being for her third studio album The Pinkprint. In 2011, Minaj won her first MTV Video Music Award for Best Hip-Hop Video for her single "Super Bass". The following year, Minaj won another award for Best Female Video for her single "Starships". In 2015 and 2018, she won the awards for Best Hip-Hop Video for "Anaconda" and "Chun-Li". She also won the BET Awards for Best Female Hip Hop Artist from 2010 to 2016.

Throughout 2011 to 2016, Minaj was nominated for a total of 10 Grammy Awards. She received her first Grammy nomination in 2011 in the category Best Rap Performance by a Duo or Group for the single "My Chick Bad" with fellow rapper Ludacris at the 53rd ceremony. For the 54th Grammy Awards in 2012, Minaj received nominations for Best New Artist and Best Rap Album for her debut album Pink Friday, and Best Rap Performance for her single "Moment 4 Life" featuring Drake. In 2015, Minaj received two nominations at the 57th Grammy Awards for Best Rap Song for her single "Anaconda" and Best Pop Duo/Group Performance for her joint single "Bang Bang", with Jessie J and Ariana Grande. For the 58th Grammy Awards in 2016, Minaj received three nominations, including Best Rap Album for her third studio album The Pinkprint.

American Music Awards
The American Music Awards is an annual music awards ceremony and one of several major annual American music awards shows. Minaj has won eight American Music Awards out of eleven nominations.

|-
|rowspan="2"|2011
|Pink Friday
|Favorite Rap/Hip-Hop Album
|
|-
|rowspan="3"|Herself
|rowspan="2"|Favorite Rap/Hip-Hop Artist
|
|-
|rowspan="4"|2012
|
|-
|Favorite Pop/Rock Female Artist
|
|-
|rowspan="2"|Pink Friday: Roman Reloaded
|Favorite Pop/Rock Album
|
|-
|rowspan="2"|Favorite Rap/Hip-Hop Album
|
|-
|rowspan="3"|2015
|The Pinkprint
|
|-
|rowspan="2"|Herself
|Artist of the Year
|
|-
|Favorite Rap/Hip-Hop Artist
|
|-
|rowspan="2"|2020
|Herself
|Favorite Female Artist – Rap/Hip-Hop
|
|-
||"Tusa"
|Favorite Song – Latin
|
|-
|rowspan="2"|2022
|Herself
|Favorite Female Artist – Rap/Hip-Hop
|
|-
|"Side to Side" <small> (Nicki Minaj & Ariana Grande) <small>
|Fan Favorite Award
|
|-
|}

Acervo Music Awards

|-
|rowspan="3"|2022
|Herself
|Best Global Rap Artist
|
|-
|Herself (BARBZ)
|Fandom Of The Year (Global)
|
|-
|Herself
|Favorite International Artist
|
|}

BellaSugar Beauty Awards
The BellaSugar Beauty Awards were presented by the pop culture blog PopSugar in 2012 to highlight stars with inner and outer beauty. Minaj has won one award.

|-
|2012
|Herself
|Best Trendsetter
|
|}

BET

BET Awards
The BET Awards were established in 2001 by the Black Entertainment Television (BET) network to celebrate African Americans and other minorities in music, acting, sports, and other fields of entertainment. The awards are presented annually and broadcasts live on BET. Minaj is the first and only female rapper to win the Best Female Hip-Hop Artist award seven years in a row. Overall, she has won twelve awards out of thirty-three nominations.

|-
|rowspan="5"|2010
|rowspan="2"|Herself
|Best New Artist
|
|-
|Best Female Hip-Hop Artist
|
|-
|rowspan="2"|Young Money
|Best New Artist
|
|-
|Best Group
|
|-
|"BedRock"(Young Money featuring Lloyd)
|Viewer's Choice
|
|-
|rowspan="4"|2011
|rowspan="2"|Herself
|Best Female Hip-Hop Artist
|
|-
|FANdemonium Award
|
|-
|"Moment 4 Life"(Nicki Minaj featuring Drake)
|rowspan="2"|Viewer's Choice
|
|-
|"Bottoms Up"(Trey Songz featuring Nicki Minaj)
|
|-
|rowspan="2"|2012
|rowspan="5"|Herself
|Best Female Hip-Hop Artist
|
|-
|FANdemonium Award
|
|-
|rowspan="2"|2013
|Best Female Hip-Hop Artist
|
|-
|FANdemonium Award
|
|-
|rowspan="2"|2014
|Best Female Hip-Hop Artist
|
|-
|rowspan="2"|Young Money
|rowspan="2"|Best Group
|
|-
|rowspan="7"|2015
|
|-
|rowspan="2"|Herself
|Best Female Hip-Hop Artist
|
|-
|FANdemonium Award
|
|-
|"Anaconda"
|Video of the Year
|
|-
|"No Love" (Remix)(August Alsina featuring Nicki Minaj)
|Best Collaboration
|
|-
|"Only"(Nicki Minaj featuring Drake, Lil Wayne andChris Brown)
|rowspan="2"|Viewer's Choice
|
|-
|"Throw Sum Mo"(Rae Sremmurd featuring Nicki Minaj andYoung Thug)
|
|-
|rowspan="2"|2016
|Herself
|Best Female Hip-Hop Artist
|
|-
|"Feeling Myself"(Nicki Minaj featuring Beyoncé)
|Best Collaboration
|
|-
|2017
|rowspan="2"|Herself
|rowspan="2"|Best Female Hip-Hop Artist
|
|-
|rowspan="3"|2018
|
|-
|"I'm Getting Ready"(Tasha Cobbs featuring Nicki Minaj)
|Dr. Bobby Jones Best Gospel/Inspirational
|
|-
|"MotorSport"(with Migos and Cardi B)
|Coca-Cola Viewers' Choice
|
|-
|2019
|rowspan="2"|Herself
|rowspan="2"|Best Female Hip-Hop Artist
|
|-
|rowspan="4"|2020
|
|-
|rowspan="3"|"Hot Girl Summer"
|Best Collaboration
|
|-
|Coca-Cola Viewers' Choice
|
|-
|Video of the Year
|
|-
|rowspan="2"|2022
|Herself
|Best Female Hip-Hop Artist
|
|-
|"Whole Lotta Money"
|Best Collaboration
|
|-
|}

BET Hip-Hop Awards
The BET Hip Hop Awards are hosted annually by the Black Entertainment Television (BET) network for Hip-Hop performers, producers and music video directors. Minaj has won eight awards out of thirty-eight nominations.

|-
|rowspan="8"|2010
|"All I Do Is Win (Remix)"
|Reese's Perfect Combo Award
|
|-
|"BedRock"
|Track of the Year
|
|-
|"Hello Good Morning (Remix)"
|Reese's Perfect Combo Award
|
|-
|rowspan="4"|Herself
|Hustler of the Year
|
|-
|Lyricist of the Year
|
|-
|Made You Look (Best Hip Hop Style)
|
|-
|Rookie of the Year
|
|-
|"Your Love"
|Verizon People's Champ Award
|
|-
|rowspan="6"|2011
|rowspan="3"|Herself
|MVP of the Year
|
|-
|Lyricist of the Year
|
|-
|Made You Look (Best Hip Hop Style)
|
|-
|Pink Friday
|CD of the Year
|
|-
|"Monster"
|Sweet 16: Best Featured Verse
|
|-
|"Moment 4 Life"
|Verizon People's Champ (Viewers Choice)
|
|-
|2012
|rowspan="5"|Herself
|rowspan="3"|Made You Look (Best Hip Hop Style)
|
|-
|2013
|
|-
|rowspan="5"|2014
|
|-
|MVP of the Year
|
|-
|Lyricist of the Year
|
|-
|"My Hitta" (Remix) (with YG, Lil Wayne, Rich Homie Quan and Meek Mill)
|People's Champ Award
|
|-
|"Pills n Potions"
|rowspan="2"|Best Hip-Hop Video
|
|-
|rowspan="9"|2015
|rowspan="2"|"Feeling Myself" (featuring Beyoncé)
|
|-
|rowspan="2"|Best Collabo, Duo or Group
|
|-
|"Truffle Butter" (featuring Drake & Lil Wayne)
|
|-
|The Pinkprint
|Album of the Year
|
|-
|rowspan="6"|Herself
|MVP of the Year
|
|-
|Lyricist of the Year
|
|-
|Hustler of the Year
|
|-
|Best Live Performer
|
|-
|rowspan="2"|Made You Look (Best Hip Hop Style)
|
|-
|rowspan="2"|2016
|
|-
|"Down in the DM (Remix)"
|Best Featured Verse
|
|-
|rowspan="3"|2017
|Herself
|Made-You-Look Award (Best Hip-Hop Style)
|
|-
|rowspan="2"|"Rake It Up"(featuring Yo Gotti)
|Best Collabo, Duo or Group
|
|-
|Best Featured Verse
|
|-
|rowspan="2"|2018
|Herself
|Made-You-Look Award
|
|-
|"Big Bank"
|Sweet 16: Best Featured Verse
|
|-
|2020
|"Hot Girl Summer"
|Best Collaboration
|
|}

BET Social Awards
The BET Social Awards are an annual awards show, airing on BET, that celebrate the very best (and worst) of social media, including the biggest memes, most popular gifs, hashtags, and all the trends that claim your timeline. Minaj has received one nomination.

|-
|2019
|Herself
|Best Celeb Follow
|
|}

Soul Train Awards
The Soul Train Music Awards is an annual award show aired in national broadcast syndication that honors the best in African-American music and entertainment. Minaj has won one award from nine nominations.

|-
|rowspan="2"|2010
|Herself
|Best New Artist
|
|-
|"Your Love"
|Best Hip-Hop Song of the Year
|
|-
|2011
|"Moment 4 Life"(Nicki Minaj featuring Drake)
|Best Hip-Hop Song of the Year
|
|-
|2012
|"Starships"
|Best Dance Performance
|
|-
|2013
|"High School"(Nicki Minaj featuring Lil Wayne)
|Best Hip-Hop Song of the Year
|
|-
|2014
|"Pills n Potions"
|Best Hip-Hop Song of the Year
|
|-
|rowspan="2"|2015
|"Feeling Myself"(Nicki Minaj featuring Beyoncé)
|Best Collaboration
|
|-
|"Truffle Butter"(Nicki Minaj featuring Drake and Lil Wayne)
|Best Hip-Hop Song of the Year
|
|-
|2017
|"Rake It Up"(Yo Gotti featuring Nicki Minaj)
|Rhythm & Bars Award
|
|}

Billboard Latin Music Awards

|-
|rowspan="6"|2021
|rowspan="1"|Herself
|Crossover Artist of the Year
|
|-
|rowspan="5"|TUSA
|Hot Latin Song of the Year
|
|-
|Vocal Event Hot Latin Song of the Year
|
|-
|Airplay Song of the Year
|
|-
|Sales Song of the Year
|
|-
|Latin Rhythm Song of the Year
|
|-
|}

Billboard Music Awards
The Billboard Music Awards are sponsored by Billboard magazine. The awards are based on sales data by Nielsen SoundScan and radio information by Nielsen Broadcast Data Systems. Minaj has received four awards out of twenty-six nominations.

|-
|rowspan="4"|2011
|rowspan="2"|Herself
|Top New Artist
|
|-
|Top Rap Artist
|
|-
|Pink Friday
|Top Rap Album
|
|-
|"Bottoms Up"(Trey Songz featuring Nicki Minaj)
|Top R&B Song
|
|-
|rowspan="7"|2012
|rowspan="4"|Herself
|Top Female Artist
|
|-
|Top Rap Artist
|
|-
|Top Radio Songs Artist
|
|-
|Top Streaming Artist
|
|-
|rowspan="3"|"Super Bass"
|Top Rap Song
|
|-
|Top Streaming Song (Audio)
|
|-
|Top Streaming Song (Video)
|
|-
|rowspan="7"|2013
|rowspan="4"|Herself
|Top Female Artist
|
|-
|Top Rap Artist
|
|-
|Top Radio Songs Artist
|
|-
|Top Streaming Artist
|
|-
|"Starships"
|Top Dance Song
|
|-
|"Girl on Fire"(Alicia Keys featuring Nicki Minaj)
|Top R&B Song
|
|-
|Pink Friday: Roman Reloaded
|Top Rap Album
|
|-
|rowspan="4"|2015
|rowspan="2"|Herself
|Top Rap Artist
|
|-
|Top Streaming Artist
|
|-
|"Anaconda"
|Top Rap Song
|
|-
|The Pinkprint
|Top Rap Album
|
|-
||2016
|"Hey Mama"(David Guetta featuring Nicki Minaj, Bebe Rexha & Afrojack)
|Top Dance Song
|
|-
||2017
|Herself
|Chart Achievement Award
|
|-
|2018
|rowspan="2"|Herself
|rowspan="2"|Top Rap Female Artist
|
|-
|2019
|
|}

Billboard.com's Mid-Year Music Awards
Within the first half of a year, the general public casts their votes for the annual Billboard.com's Mid-Year Music Awards. The winners are announced at the beginning of July. Minaj has won two awards out of eleven nominations.

|-
|2011
|rowspan="2"|Herself
|Best Dressed
|
|-
|rowspan="2"|2012
|First-Half MVP
|
|-
|Nicki Minaj & Hot 97
|Most Memorable Feud
|
|-
|2013
|Nicki Minaj & Mariah Carey
|Most Memorable Feud
|
|-
|rowspan="3"|2014
|rowspan="2"|"Pills n Potions"
|Best Music Video
|
|-
|Song That Will Dominate 2014's Second Half
|
|-
|The Pinkprint
|Most Anticipated Music Event of 2014'sSecond Half
|
|-
|rowspan="5"|2015
|Herself
|First-Half MVP
|
|-
|"Feeling Myself"
|rowspan="2"|Best Music Video
|
|-
|"Bitch I'm Madonna"(Madonna featuring Nicki Minaj)
|
|-
|Nicki Minaj & Meek Mill
|Hottest Couple
|
|}

Billboard Women in Music
Billboard Women in Music is an annual ceremony hosted by Billboard, which honours women in music for their roles in music and their accomplishments. Minaj has been honoured two times.

|-
|2011
|rowspan="2"|Herself
|Rising Star
|
|-
|2019
|Game Changer
|
|}

BMI Awards
Broadcast Music, Inc. (BMI) is one of three United States performing rights organizations, along with ASCAP and SESAC. It collects license fees on behalf of songwriters, composers, and music publishers and distributes them as royalties to those members whose works have been performed. Minaj has received forty-seven BMI Awards including eleven BMI London Awards, seven BMI Pop Awards, twenty-seven BMI R&B/Hip-Hop awards and two BMI Trailblazers of Gospel Music Awards.

BMI London Awards

|-
|rowspan="2"|2011
|"Your Love"
|rowspan="8"|Award-Winning Songs
|
|-
|"Check It Out"(with will.i.am)
|
|-
|2012
|"Where Them Girls At"(David Guetta featuring Flo Rida andNicki Minaj)
|
|-
|rowspan="4"|2013
|"Starships"
|
|-
|"Pound the Alarm"
|
|-
|"Turn Me On"(David Guetta featuring Nicki Minaj)
|
|-
|"Beauty and a Beat"(Justin Bieber featuring Nicki Minaj)
|
|-
|rowspan="2"|2016
|rowspan="2"|"Hey Mama"(David Guetta featuring Nicki Minaj, Bebe Rexha and Afrojack)
|
|-
|Dance Award
|
|-
|rowspan="2"|2019
|"FEFE"
|rowspan="2"|Award-Winning Songs
|
|-
|"MotorSport"
|
|}

BMI Pop Awards

|-
|2012
|"Super Bass"
|rowspan="7"|Award-Winning Songs
|
|-
|rowspan="2"|2013
|"Starships"
|
|-
|"Turn Me On"(David Guetta featuring Nicki Minaj)
|
|-
|2014
|"Beauty and a Beat"(Justin Bieber featuring Nicki Minaj)
|
|-
|rowspan="2"|2016
|"Bang Bang"(with Jessie J and Ariana Grande)
|
|-
|"Hey Mama"(David Guetta featuring Nicki Minaj, Bebe Rexha and Afrojack)
|
|-
|2018
|"Side to Side"
|
|}

BMI R&B/Hip-Hop Awards

|-
|rowspan="4"|2011
|"BedRock"
|rowspan="4"|Award-Winning Songs
|
|-
|"Bottoms Up"
|
|-
|"My Chick Bad"
|
|-
|"Your Love"
|
|-
|rowspan="6"|2012
|rowspan="2"|"Super Bass"
|Urban Song of the Year
|
|-
|rowspan="2"|Award-Winning Songs
|
|-
|"Fly"(Nicki Minaj featuring Rihanna)
|
|-
|rowspan="2"|"Make Me Proud"(Drake featuring Nicki Minaj)
|Hot R&B/Hip-Hop Airplay & Hot R&B/Hip-Hop Songs
|
|-
|Hot Rap Songs
|
|-
|"Moment 4 Life"(Nicki Minaj featuring Drake)
|Award-Winning Songs
|
|-
|rowspan="6"|2013
|Herself
|Songwriters of the Year 
|
|-
|rowspan="2"|"Starships"
|Song of the Year
|
|-
|rowspan="15"|Award-Winning Songs
|
|-
|"Dance (A$$)"(Big Sean featuring Nicki Minaj)
|
|-
|"Girl on Fire"(Alicia Keys featuring Nicki Minaj)
|
|-
|"Make Me Proud"(Drake featuring Nicki Minaj)
|
|-
|2014
|"Love More"
|
|-
|2015
|"Anaconda"
|
|-
|rowspan="4"|2016
|"All Eyes on You"
|
|-
|"Only"(featuring Drake, Lil Wayne and Chris Brown)
|
|-
|"Truffle Butter"(featuring Drake and Lil Wayne)
|
|-
|"The Night Is Still Young"
|
|-
|2017
|"Do You Mind"
|
|-
|2018
|"Rake It Up"
|
|-
|rowspan="3"|2019
|"Big Bank"
|
|-
|"FEFE"
|
|-
|"MotorSport"
|
|}

BMI Trailblazers of Gospel Music Awards

|-
|rowspan="2"|2020
|rowspan="2"|"I'm Getting Ready"
|Award-Winning Songs
|
|-
|Song of the Year
|
|}

BMI Latin Awards

|-
|rowspan="1"|2022
|"Tusa"
|LATIN PUBLISHER OF THE YEAR
|
|}

Boston Music Awards

Boston Music Awards are a set of music awards given annually that showcase talent in the Boston, Massachusetts, area.

|-
|rowspan="2"|2021
|"Whole Lotta Money"
|rowspan="8"|Song of the Year (1 Million+ Streams)
| 
|-
|}

Bravo Otto
The Bravo Otto is a German accolade honoring excellence of performers in film, television and music. The award is presented in Gold, Silver and Bronze. Minaj has received three Bronze (for third place) awards.

|-
|2012
|rowspan="3"|Herself
|rowspan="3"|Super-Rapper
|
|-
|2013
|
|-
|2015
|
|}

Break the Internet Awards
Paper'''s Break the Internet Awards celebrate Internet culture, fashion, music, art and social media. Voting takes place over the Internet. Minaj has received two nominations.

|-
|rowspan="2"|2018
|Queen|Music Drop of the Year
|
|-
|Queen Album Art
|Instagram Photo of the Year
|
|}

Capital FM
Capital FM's Music Video Awards
The British radio station Capital FM was handing out the Capital FM's Music Video Awards to honor the accomplishments of stars and their music video in 2012. Minaj has received five nominations.

|-
|rowspan="5"|2013
|Nas and Nicki Minaj - "Right By My Side"
|Best Kiss
|
|-
|"Starships"
|Raunchiest Video
|
|-
|"Pound the Alarm"
|Best You Could Never Wear That In Real Life Outfit
|
|-
|"Beauty and a Beat"
|rowspan="2"|Best Video
|
|-
|"Starships"
|
|}

Capital Loves Awards
The British radio station Capital FM established the Capital Loves Awards to honor musicians and artist that are successful in the United Kingdom. Minaj has received one nomination.

|-
|2014
|"Bang Bang"
|Best Single
|
|}

Capital Twitter Awards

|-
|2013
|rowspan="2"|Herself
|Most Revealing Pictures
|
|-
|2014
|Most #Selfie Obsessed Star
|
|}

Capricho Awards
The Capricho Awards was an annual awards with categories consisting of music, TV, cinema, Internet, among others and organized by the Brazilian teen magazine Capricho, with open voting on the official website of Editora Abril. Minaj has won one award out of two nominations.

|-
|2011
|Herself
|Revelação Internacional
|
|-
|2015
|Nicki Minaj vs. Taylor Swift
|Bafo do Ano
|
|}

BRIT Awards
The Brit Awards are the British Phonographic Industry's annual popular music awards. Minaj has won one award out of two nominations.

|-
|2012
|Herself
|International Breakthrough Act
|
|-
|2019
|"Woman Like Me" (Little Mix featuring Nicki Minaj)
|British Artist Video of the Year
|
|}

Dorian Awards
The Dorian Awards are an annual endeavor organized by GALECA: The Society of LGBTQ Entertainment Critics (founded in 2009 as the Gay and Lesbian Entertainment Critics Association). GALECA is an association of professional journalists and critics covering film and television for print, online, and broadcast outlets in the United States, Canada, and the United Kingdom. Minaj has received one nomination.

|-
|2014
|"Anaconda"
|Video of the Year
|
|}

EbonyEbony is a monthly magazine that focuses on news, culture, and entertainment; its target audience is the African–American community, and its coverage includes the lifestyles and accomplishments of influential black people, fashion, beauty, and politics. Minaj has been honored on their Power 100 list in 2012.

|-
|2012
|Herself
|Honorees
|
|}

Fashion Los Angeles Awards
The Fashion Los Angeles Awards is an annual ceremony created by The Daily Front Row in 2015 to honor the best in fashion in Hollywood. Minaj has won one award.

|-
|2017
|Herself
|Fashion Rebel
|
|}

Global Awards
The Global Awards are held by Global and reward music played on British radio stations including Capital, Capital XTRA, Heart, Classic FM, Smooth, Radio X, LBC and Gold, with the awards categories reflecting the songs, artists, programmes and news aired on each station. Minaj has won one award.

|-
|2019
|"Woman Like Me" (with Little Mix)
|Best Song
|
|}

Grammy Awards
A Grammy Award (stylized as GRAMMY, originally called Gramophone Award), or Grammy, is an award presented by The Recording Academy to recognize achievements in the music industry. Minaj has been nominated 10 times since 2011.

|-
|2011
|"My Chick Bad" (with Ludacris)
|Best Rap Performance by a Duo or Group
|
|-
|rowspan="4"|2012
|Herself
|Best New Artist
|
|-
|Loud (as featured artist)
|Album of the Year
|
|-
|"Moment 4 Life" (featuring Drake)
|Best Rap Performance
|
|-
|Pink Friday|Best Rap Album
|
|-
|rowspan="2"|2015
|"Anaconda"
|Best Rap Song
|
|-
|"Bang Bang" (with Jessie J and Ariana Grande)
|Best Pop Duo/Group Performance
|
|-
|rowspan="3"|2016
|"Only" (featuring Drake, Lil Wayne andChris Brown)
|Best Rap/Sung Collaboration
|
|-
|"Truffle Butter" (featuring Drake and Lil Wayne)
|Best Rap Performance
|
|-
|The Pinkprint|Best Rap Album
|
|}

Guinness World Records
The Guinness World Records, known from its inception from 1955 until 2000 as The Guinness Book of Records and in previous United States editions as The Guinness Book of World Records, is a reference work published annually, listing world record both of human achievements and the extremes of the natural world. Minaj currently holds three records.

|-
|2017
|Nicki Minaj
|Most Billboard Hot 100 entries by a solo artist (female)
|
|-
||2021
|Nicki Minaj
|Most US singles chart entries before reaching No.1
|
|-
|2021
| "Say So" 
| First female rap duo to reach No.1 on the US singles chart
|
|-
|}

Heat Latin Music Awards
The Heat Latin Music Awards is an annual awards show that airs on the HTV cable channel, which is usually held in early June, that honors the year's biggest Latin music acts, as voted by HTV viewers. Minaj has received two nominations.

|-
|2019
|"Krippy Kush (Remix)"
|Mejor Colaboración
|
|-
|2020
|"Tusa"
|Mejor Video
|
|}

HipHopDXHipHopDX is an online magazine of hip hop music criticism and news. Minaj has won four HipHopDX Year End Awards out of seven nominations and five HipHopDX Turkey Awards.

HipHopDX Year End Awards

|-
|rowspan="3"|2010
|Herself
|Emcee of the Year
|
|-
|rowspan="2"|"Monster"
|Collaboration of the Year
|
|-
|Verse of the Year
|
|-
|2012
|Pink Friday: Roman Reloaded|Disappointing Album of the Year
|
|-
|2013
|Nicki Minaj's Halloween Costume
|Instagram of the Year
|
|-
|2014
|"Anaconda" Artwork
|Instagram of the Year
|
|-
|2018
|Queen|Disappointing Album of the Year
|
|}

HipHopDX Turkey Awards

|-
|2009
|Herself
|The "Stanley Kubrick: Can't Stop Watching" Award
|
|-
|2010
|Drake and Nicki Minaj's Marriage
|The Wasting Our Time Award
|
|-
|2016
|Nicki Minaj and RetcH
|The Joanne The Scammer Award
|
|-
|2017
|Nicki Minaj and Remy Ma
|The Beef for Breakfast, Lunch and Dinner Award
|
|-
|2018
|Herself
|The Sore Loser Award
|
|}

iHeartRadio Music Awards
The iHeartRadio Music Awards is an international music awards show, founded by iHeartRadio in 2014, and recognizes the most popular artists and music over the past year as determined by the network's listeners. Minaj has won 2 awards out of 12 nominations.

|-
|2015
|"Bang Bang"(with Jessie J and Ariana Grande)
|Best Collaboration
|
|-
|rowspan="3"|2016
|"Truffle Butter"(Nicki Minaj featuring Drake and Lil Wayne)
|Hip-Hop Song of the Year
|
|-
|"Hey Mama"(David Guetta featuring Nicki Minaj,Bebe Rexha and Afrojack)
|Dance Song of the Year
|
|-
|Nicki Minaj
|Best Fan Army
|
|-
|2017
|"Side to Side"
|Best Music Video
|
|-
|2018
|"Swish Swish"
|Best Music Video
|
|-
|2020
|"Hot Girl Summer"
|Best Lyrics
|
|-
|2021
|"Tusa"
|Latin Pop/Reggaeton Song of the Year
|
|-
|rowspan="4"|2023
|Super Freaky Girl
|Best Lyrics 
|
|-
|Super Freaky Girl
|TikTok Bop of the Year
|
|-
|Nicki Minaj (Barbz)
|Best Fan Army
|
|-
|Super Freaky Girl
|Favorite use of a sample
|
|}

iHeartRadio MMVAs
The iHeartRadio MMVAs (originally an initialism of Much Music Video Awards) are annual awards presented by the Canadian television channel Much to honour the year's best music videos. Minaj has received four nominations.

|-
|2010
|"BedRock"
|International Video of the Year - Group
|
|-
|rowspan="2"|2012
|"Starships"
|rowspan="3"|International Video of the Year – Artist
|
|-
|"Turn Me On"(David Guetta featuring Nicki Minaj)
|
|-
|2013
|"Va Va Voom"
|
|}

International Dance Music Awards
The International Dance Music Awards are held annually as part of the Winter Music Conference. Minaj has won two awards out of fifteen nominations.

|-
|rowspan="4"|2012
|rowspan="2"|Super Bass
|Best R&B/Urban Dance Track
|
|-
|rowspan="2"|Best Rap/Hip Hop Dance Track
|
|-
|"Where Them Girls At"(David Guetta featuring Flo Rida andNicki Minaj)
|
|-
|Herself
|Best Break-Through Artist (Solo)
|
|-
|rowspan="3"|2013
|"Starships"
|Best Rap/Hip Hop Dance Track
|
|-
|"Pound the Alarm"
|rowspan="2"|Best R&B/Urban Dance Track
|
|-
|"Make Me Proud"(Drake featuring Nicki Minaj)
|
|-
|rowspan="2"|2015
|"Anaconda"
|Best Rap/Hip Hop Dance Track
|
|-
|"Bang Bang"(with Jessie J and Ariana Grande)
|Best Rap/Hip Hop/Trap Dance Track
|
|-
|rowspan="6"|2016
|rowspan="2"|"Hey Mama"(David Guetta feat. Nicki Minaj, Bebe Rexha & Afrojack)
|Best R&B/Urban Dance Track
|
|-
|rowspan="3"|Best Rap/Hip Hop/Trap Dance Track
|
|-
|"Throw Sum Mo"(Rae Sremmurd featuring Nicki Minaj and Young Thug)
|
|-
|"Truffle Butter"(featuring Drake and Lil Wayne)
|
|-
|rowspan="2"|"Bitch I'm Madonna"(Madonna featuring Nicki Minaj)
|Best Commercial/Pop Dance Track
|
|-
|Best Music Video
|
|}

Japan Gold Disc Awards
The Japan Gold Disc Awards are a prestigious awards ceremony held annually in Japan, winners are based mainly on sales that provided by "The Recording Industry Association of Japan" (RIAJ). Minaj has won one award.

|-
|2012
|Herself
|Best International 3 New Artists
|
|}

JIM Awards
The JIM Awards (Flemish: De Jimmies) were an annual awards show presented by the Flemish television channel JIM since 2012 and ceased broadcast in 2015. Minaj has received four nominations.

|-
|2013
|rowspan="3"|Herself
|rowspan="2"|Best Urban
|
|-
|rowspan="3"|2015
|
|-
|Best Female International
|
|-
|"Anaconda"
|Best Video
|
|}

Latin American Music Awards
The Latin American Music Awards (Latin AMAs) is an annual American music award that is presented by Telemundo. Minaj has received three nominations.

|-
|rowspan="3"|2021
|rowspan="3"|Tusa"
|Collaboration of the Year
|
|-
|Favorite Urban Song
|
|-
|Song of the Year
|
|}

Latin Grammy Awards
A Latin Grammy Award is an award by The Latin Recording Academy to recognize outstanding achievement in the Latin music industry. Minaj has received two nominations.

|-
|rowspan="2"|2020
|rowspan="2"|"Tusa"
|Record of the Year
|
|-
|Song of the Year
|
|}

Latin Music Italian Awards
The Latin Music Italian Awards, abbreviated as LMIAs, is a musical event that takes place annually in the city of Milan. Minaj has won two awards out of four nominations.

|-
|rowspan="4"|2020
|rowspan="4"|"Tusa"
|Best Latin Song
|
|-
|Best Spanglish Song
|
|-
|Best Latin Collaboration
|
|-
|Best Latin Female Video
|
|}

LOS40 Music Awards
LOS40 Music Awards, formerly known as Premios 40 Principales, is an award show by the musical radio station Los 40 Principales. Minaj has won one award out of three nominations.

|-
|2012
|Nicki Minaj
|Best International New Act
|
|-
|rowspan="2"|2020
|rowspan="2"|"Tusa" 
|Best Latin Song
|
|-
|Best Latin Video
|
|}

MOBO Awards
The Music of Black Origin (MOBO) Awards were established in 1996 by Kanya King. It is held annually in the United Kingdom to recognize artists of any race or nationality performing music of black origin. Minaj has won one award out of four nominations.

|-
|2010
|rowspan="4"|Herself
|rowspan="4"|Best International Act
|
|-
|2011
|
|-
|2012
|
|-
|2014
|

monitorLATINO Music Awards
The monitorLATINO Music Awards, celebrated in Playa del Carmen, are the first-ever awards organized by Monitor Latino in the world and they are 100% based on airplay across radio stations in Latin American countries and Hispanic radio stations in the United States using the Radio Tracking Data, LLC in real time. Minaj has received two nominations.

|-
|rowspan="2"|2020
|rowspan="2"|"Tusa"
|Canción Año Urbana
|
|-
|Colaboración del año
|
|}

MP3 Music Awards
The MP3 Music Awards (MMA) is an annual music awards show in the United Kingdom, and chosen by worldwide public votes. Minaj has won one award from four nominations.

|-
|2011
|"Super Bass"
|Music Industry Choice Award
|
|-
|rowspan="2"|2012
|"Fireball" (Willow Smith featuring Nicki Minaj)
|Best / Teen / Music
|
|-
|"Turn Me On" (David Guetta featuring Nicki Minaj)
|House / Dance / Trance
|
|-
|2014
|"Anaconda"
|Radio / Charts / Downloads
|
|}

MTV
MTV Africa Music Awards
The MTV Africa Music Awards (also known as the MAMAs) were established in 2008 by MTV Networks Africa to celebrate the most popular contemporary music in Africa. Minaj has won one award.

|-
|2015
|Herself
|Best International Act
|
|}

MTV Europe Music Awards
The MTV Europe Music Awards (EMAs) were established in 1994 by MTV Networks Europe to celebrate the most popular songs and singers in Europe. The MTV Europe Music Awards today is a popular celebration of what MTV viewers consider the best in music. The awards are chosen by MTV viewers. Minaj has won eight awards out of seventeen nominations.

|-
|rowspan="3"|2012
|rowspan="3"|Herself
|Best Female
|
|-
|Best Hip-Hop
|
|-
|Best Look
|
|-
|rowspan="4"|2014
|rowspan="4"|Herself
|Best Female
|
|-
|Best Hip-Hop
|
|-
|Best Look
|
|-
|Biggest Fans
|
|-
|rowspan="5"|2015
|rowspan="4"|Herself
|Best Female
|
|-
|Best Hip-Hop
|
|-
|Best US Act
|
|-
|Best Look
|
|-
|"Hey Mama"(David Guetta featuring Nicki Minaj,Bebe Rexha and Afrojack)
|Best Collaboration
|
|-
|rowspan="2"|2018
|rowspan="3"|Herself
|Best Hip-Hop
|
|-
|Best Look
|
|-
|2019
|Best Hip-Hop
|
|-
|rowspan="2"|2020
|rowspan="2"|"Tusa"
|Best Video
|
|-
|Best Collaboration
|
|-
|rowspan="1"|2021
|rowspan="1"|Herself
|Best Hip-Hop
|
|-
|rowspan="5"|2022
|rowspan="2"|"Super Freaky Girl"
|Best Song
|
|-
|Best Video
|
|-
|Herself
|Best Hip Hop
|
|-
|Herself 
|Best Artist 
|
|-
|rowspan="1"|Herself/Barbz
|Biggest Fans
|
|-
|}

MTV Fandom Awards
The MTV Fandom Awards are an annual pop culture, television and film awards show presented by MTV with awards voted on by fans. Minaj has received one nomination.

|-
|2015
|Barbz
|Fandom Army of the Year
|
|}

MTV Italian Music Awards
The MTV Italian Music Awards (known as TRL Awards from 2006 to 2012) were established in 2006 by MTV Italy to celebrate the most popular artists and music videos in Italy. Minaj has received one nomination.

|-
|2012
|Herself
|Best Look
|
|}

MTV Millennial Awards
The MTV Millennial Awards (commonly abbreviated as a MIAW) is an annual program of Latin American music awards, presented by the cable channel MTV Latin America to honor the best of Latin music and the digital world of the millennial generation.

|-
|2019
|Cardi B vs. Nicki Minaj
|Ridiculous of the Year
|
|-
|rowspan="2"|2020
|rowspan="2"|"Say So (Remix)"
|Hit Global
|
|-
|Feat Gringo
|
|}

MTV O Music Awards
The MTV Online, Open, Ongoing Music Awards (also known as the OMAs) are one of the major annual awards established by MTV to honor the art, creativity, personality and technology of music in the digital era. It's a "spinoff" of the VMAs, but uses online features such as Twitter, YouTube, and such to determine the nominees. Minaj has won one award out of six nominations.

|-
|rowspan="3"|2010
|rowspan="6"|Herself
|Fan Army FTW
|
|-
|Must Follow Artist on Twitter
|
|-
|Favorite Animated GIF
|
|-
|2011
|Fan Army FTW
|
|-
|rowspan="2"|2012
|Too Much Ass for TV
|
|-
|Most Intense Social Splat
|
|}

MTV Video Music Awards
The MTV Video Music Awards (commonly abbreviated as VMA) were established in 1984 by the cable channel MTV to honor the top music videos of the year. Minaj has won five out of sixteen nominations.

|-
|2010
|"Massive Attack"(Nicki Minaj featuring Sean Garrett)
|Best New Artist
|
|-
|rowspan="3"|2011
|rowspan="2"|"Super Bass"
|Best Female Video
|
|-
|Best Hip-Hop Video
|
|-
|"Moment 4 Life"(Nicki Minaj featuring Drake)
|Best Collaboration
|
|-
|rowspan="2"|2012
|"Beez in the Trap"(Nicki Minaj featuring 2 Chainz)
|Best Hip-Hop Video
|
|-
|"Starships"
|Best Female Video
|
|-
|rowspan="3"|2015
|rowspan="2"|"Anaconda"
|Best Female Video
|
|-
|Best Hip-Hop Video
|
|-
|"Bang Bang"(with Jessie J and Ariana Grande)
|Best Collaboration
|
|-
|2017
|"Side to Side"(with Ariana Grande)
|Best Choreography
|
|-
|2018
|"Chun-Li"
|Best Hip Hop Video
|
|-
|2019
|"Hot Girl Summer"(with Megan Thee Stallion & Ty Dolla Sign)
|Best Power Anthem
|
|-
|rowspan="2"|2020
|rowspan="2"|"Tusa"(with Karol G)
|Best Collaboration
|
|-
|Best Latin
|
|-
|rowspan="3"|2022
|"Super Freaky Girl"
|Song of the Summer
|
|-
|"Do We Have a Problem?"
|Best Hip Hop
|
|-
|Herself
|Michael Jackson Video Vanguard Award
|
|-
|}

MTV Video Music Awards Brazil
The MTV Video Music Awards Brazil (originally Video Music Awards Brazil), more commonly known as VMB, were MTV Brasil's annual award ceremony, established in 1995. Minaj has received one nomination.

|-
|2012
|Herself
|Best International Act
|
|}

MTV Video Music Awards Japan
The MTV Video Music Awards Japan is the Japanese version of the MTV Video Music Awards. In this event artists are awarded for their songs and videos through online voting from channel viewers. Minaj has received eight nominations.

|-
|2011
|"Check It Out"(with will.i.am)
|Best Collaboration
|
|-
|rowspan="2"|2012
|rowspan="2"|"Where Them Girls At"(David Guetta featuring Flo Rida andNicki Minaj)
|Best Dance Video
|
|-
|Best Male Video
|
|-
|rowspan="4"|2013
|rowspan="2"|"Girl on Fire"(Alicia Keys featuring Nicki Minaj)
|Best Female Video
|
|-
|Best R&B Video
|
|-
|rowspan="2"|"Beauty and a Beat"(Justin Bieber featuring Nicki Minaj)
|Best Male Video
|
|-
|Best Pop Video
|
|-
|2015
|"Bitch I'm Madonna"(Madonna featuring Nicki Minaj)
|Best Female Video
|
|}

MTV Platinum Video Plays Awards

|-
|rowspan="2"|2012
|"Super Bass"
|Gold
|
|-
|"Where Them Girls At"(David Guetta featuring Nicki Minaj and Flo Rida)
|rowspan="3"|Platinum
|
|-
|rowspan="2"|2013
|"Starships"
|
|-
|"Turn Me On"(David Guetta featuring Nicki Minaj)
|
|}

MTV2 Sucker Free Awards

|-
|rowspan="5"|2010
|"Hello Good Morning (Remix)"
|rowspan="2"|Remix of the Year
|
|-
|"Hold Yuh (Remix)"
|
|-
|My Chick Bad
|Verse of the Year
|
|-
|"Roger That"
|The People's Crown
|
|-
|"5 Star Chick (Remix)"
|Remix of the Year
|
|-
|2011
|Herself
|Artist That Ran 2011
|
|}

Other accolades

|-
|rowspan="4"|2010
|rowspan="5"|Herself
|Hottest MC in the Game
|
|-
|MTV News's Hottest Breakthrough MC
|
|-
|MTV News's Woman of the Year
|
|-
|MTVU's Woman of the Year
|
|-
|2011
|Hottest MC in the Game
|
|}

NAACP Image Awards
An NAACP Image Award is an accolade presented by the American National Association for the Advancement of Colored People to honor outstanding people of color in film, television, music, and literature. Minaj has received one nomination.

|-
|2011
|Herself
|New Artist
|
|}

NARM Awards
The National Association of Recording Merchandisers (NARM) was established in 1958 and is a United States not-for-profit trade association that serves music retailing businesses in lobbying and trade promotion. Minaj has received one award.

|-
|2011
|Herself
|Breakthrough Artist of the Year
|
|}

NET Honours
The NET Honours debuted in 2013 as a special recognition award presented to deserving individuals in the Nigerian entertainment industry during the Nigerian Entertainment Conference Live (NEC Live) event, organised by Netng. Minaj has received one nomination.

|-
|2020
|Herself
|Most Popular Foreign Celebrity (Female)
|
|}

NewNowNext Awards
The NewNowNext-Awards is an American annual entertainment awards show, presented by the lesbian, gay, bisexual and transgender-themed channel Logo. Minaj has received one nomination.

|-
|2013
|Herself
|Best New Do
|
|}

New York Music Awards
The New York Music Awards is an annual awards ceremony and live concert, established in 1986 with its first sold-out show at Madison Square Garden, New York City, United States. Minaj has won five awards.

|-
|rowspan="5"|2011
|rowspan="2"|Herself
|Best Female Hip-Hop Artist
|
|-
|Debut Artist of the Year
|
|-
|"Monster"
|Best Featured Hip-Hop Artist
|
|-
|Pink Friday|Best Debut Hip-Hop Album
|
|-
|"Your Love"
|Best Debut Hip-Hop Single
|
|}

Nickelodeon Kids' Choice Awards
The Nickelodeon Kids' Choice Awards, also known as the KCAs or Kids Choice Awards, is an annual awards show that airs on the Nickelodeon cable channel, that honors the year's biggest television, movie, and music acts, as voted by Nickelodeon viewers. Minaj has won one award out of five nominations.

|-
|rowspan="2"|2015
|Herself
|Favorite Female Artist
|
|-
|"Bang Bang"(with Jessie J and Ariana Grande)
|Favorite Song of the Year
|
|-
||2016
|Herself
|Favorite Female Artist
|
|-
|rowspan="3"|2017
|Side to Side (with Ariana Grande)
|Best Song
|
|-
|Herself
|Favorite Female Artist
|
|}

NRJ Music Awards
The NRJ Music Awards were created in 2000 by the radio station NRJ in partnership with the television network TF1. They give out awards to popular musicians by different categories. Minaj has received three nominations.

|-
|rowspan="2"|2013
|Herself
|International Female Artist of the Year
|
|-
|"Beauty and a Beat"(Justin Bieber featuring Nicki Minaj)
|rowspan="2"|Video of the Year
|
|-
|2015
|"Hey Mama"(David Guetta featuring Nicki Minaj, BebeRexha & Afrojack)
|
|-
|rowspan="2"|2020
|rowspan="2"|"Tusa"
|International Song of the Year
|
|-
|International Collaboration of the Year
|
|-
|2022
|Super Freaky Girl  
|RECOVERY / ADAPTATION
|
|-
|}

People's Choice Awards
The People's Choice Awards is an American awards show established in 1974 that recognizes the people and the work of popular culture, and is voted on by the general public. Minaj has won four awards out of seven nominations.

|-
|2012
|rowspan="3"|Herself
|Favorite Hip-Hop Artist
|
|-
|2013
|Favorite Hip-Hop Artist
|
|-
|rowspan="2"|2015
|Favorite Hip-Hop Artist
|
|-
|"Bang Bang"(with Jessie J and Ariana Grande)
|Favorite Song
|
|-
|2016
|rowspan="2"|Herself
|Favorite Hip-Hop Artist
|
|-
|rowspan="2"|2018
|The Female Artist of 2018
|
|-
|Queen|The Album of 2018
|
|}

Premios Juventud
Los Premios Juventud (Youth Awards) is an awards show for Spanish-speaking celebrities in the areas of film, music, sports, fashion, and pop culture, presented by the television network Univision. Minaj has received one nomination.

|-
|2020
|"Tusa"
|La Más Pegajosa (Can't Get Enough of this Song)
|
|}

Premios Lo Nuestro
Los Premios Lo Nuestro (Spanish for "Our Thing") is a Spanish-language awards show honoring the best of Latin music, presented by Univision, a Spanish-language television network based in the United States. Minaj has received four nominations.

|-
|rowspan="4"|2021
|rowspan="4"|"Tusa"
|"Crossover" Collaboration Of The Year
|
|-
|Song of the Year
|
|-
|Urban - Collaboration Of The Year
|
|-
|Urban - Song Of The Year
|
|}

Premios MUSA
The Premios MUSA  is presented by Ibero Americana Radio Chile to highlight the best of music in Chile. Minaj has received one nomination.

|-
|2020
|"Tusa"
|International Latin Song of the Year
|
|}

 Premios Tu Música Urbana 
Los Premios Tu Música Urbana is the first Latin urban music awards, launched by Telemundo Puerto Rico since 2019. Minaj has received one nomination.

|-
|2019
|"Tusa"
|Canción Femenina
|
|}

Premios Quiero
Los Premios Quiero is an awards show created by the music channel Quiero Música En Mi Idioma to honor the best of Spanish-speaking music. Minaj has won one award out of two nominations.

|-
|rowspan="2"|2020
|rowspan="2"|"Tusa"
|Mejor Video Urbano 2020
|
|-
|Video Del Año 2020
|
|}

Q Awards
The Q Awards are the UK's annual music awards run by the music magazine Q. Since they began in 1990, they have become one of Britain's biggest and best publicised music awards, helped in no small part by the often boisterous behavior of the celebrities who attend the event.

|-
||2012
|"Starships"
|Best Video
|
|}

Radio Disney Music Awards
The Radio Disney Music Awards (RDMA) is an annual awards show operated and governed by Radio Disney, an American radio network. Minaj has received one nomination.

|-
|2013
|"Beauty and a Beat"
|Song of the Year
|
|}

Shorty Awards
The Shorty Awards, also known as the "Shortys", is an annual awards show recognizing the people and organizations that produce real-time short form content across Twitter, Facebook, Tumblr, YouTube, Instagram and the rest of the social web. Minaj has received one nomination.

|-
|2016
|Herself
|Best Musician
|
|}

Spotify Awards
The Spotify Awards, celebrated in Mexico City, are the first-ever awards organized by Spotify in the world and they are 100% based on user-generated data in Mexico. Minaj has won one award.

|-
|2020
|"Tusa"
|The Monday Song
|
|}

Steeple Awards
The Steeple Awards are an annual gospel music awards ceremony established in 2016 and powered by the gospel radio station Praise 102.5. Minaj has won one award.

|-
|2018
|"I'm Getting Ready"
|Collaboration of The Year
|
|}

Stellar Awards
The Stellar Awards is an awards show presented by SAGMA to recognize achievements in the gospel music industry. They are the first of the Big Two major gospel music awards held annually. Minaj has received one nomination.

|-
|2018
|"I'm Getting Ready"
|Urban/Inspirational Single or Performance of the Year
|
|}

Teen Choice Awards
The Teen Choice Awards were established in 1999 to honor the year's biggest achievements in music, movies, sports and television, as voted for by young people aged between 13 and 19 years. Minaj has won four awards out of twenty-one nominations.

|-
|rowspan="2"|2010
|Herself
|Choice Breakout Artist: Female
|
|-
|Young Money
|Choice Music: Group
|
|-
|rowspan="2"|2011
|Herself
|Choice R&B/Hip-Hop Artist
|
|-
|"Super Bass"
|Choice Summer Song
|
|-
|rowspan="3"|2012
|rowspan="2"|Herself
|Choice R&B/Hip-Hop Artist
|
|-
|Choice Fashion Icon: Female
|
|-
|"Starships"
|Choice R&B/Hip-Hop Song
|
|-
|rowspan="2"|2013
|Herself
|Choice R&B/Hip-Hop Artist
|
|-
|"Beauty and a Beat"(Justin Bieber featuring Nicki Minaj)
|Choice Single: Male
|
|-
|rowspan="3"|2014
|rowspan="2"|Herself
|Choice R&B/Hip-Hop Artist
|
|-
|Choice Summer Music Star: Female
|
|-
|"Pills n Potions"
|Choice R&B/Hip-Hop Song
|
|-
|rowspan="5"|2015
|rowspan="3"|Herself
|Choice R&B/Hip-Hop Artist
|
|-
|Choice Summer Music Star: Female
|
|-
|Choice Social Media Queen
|
|-
|"Bang Bang"(with Jessie J and Ariana Grande)
|Choice Single: Female
|
|-
|"Hey Mama"(David Guetta featuring Nicki Minaj, BebeRexha and Afrojack)
|Choice Music Collaboration
|
|-
|rowspan="2"|2016
|Herself
|Choice R&B/Hip-Hop Artist
|
|-
|"Barbershop: The Next Cut"
|Choice Movie Actress: Comedy
|
|-
|2017
|rowspan="3"|Herself
|rowspan="3"|Choice R&B/Hip-Hop Artist
|
|-
|2018
|
|-
|2019
|
|}

Telehit Awards
The Telehit Awards (Spanish: Premios Telehit) are annual award show run by the Mexican music channel Telehit. Minaj has won two awards out of three nominations.

|-
||2013
|"Beauty and a Beat" (ft Nicki Minaj)
|Song of the Public
|
|-
|2014
|Herself
|The Golden Butt
|
|-
|2017
|"Swalla"
|Song of the Year
|
|}

Minaj has been honoured as the Woman of the Year in 2012.

|-
|2012
|Herself
|Woman of the Year
|
|}

UK Asian Music Awards
The UK Asian Music Awards (UK AMA) is an awards show that is held annually in the United Kingdom since 2002. Award winners are decided by public voting, from a list of nominees presented by the event organizers. Minaj has won one award.

|-
|2011
|"2012 (It Ain't the End)"(Jay Sean featuring Nicki Minaj)
|Best Video
|
|}

Urban Music Awards
The Urban Music Awards (UMA) is a hip-hop, R&B, dance and soul music awards ceremony launched by Jordan Kensington in 2003 and now held in several countries. Minaj has received two nominations.

|-
|2011
|rowspan="2"|Herself
|rowspan="2"|International Artist of the Year
|
|-
|2018
|
|}

VH1
VH1's Do Something Awards
The Do Something Awards is the joint awards show by "Do Something Services" and VH1. It is the national award show honouring people for community service, the nation's best, young world-changers. They also honour awards for style, music artists, social networks and movie stars. Minaj has received one nomination.

|-
|2012
|Nicki Minaj & Ricky Martin
|Do Something Style
|
|}

VH1 Big In 2015 with Entertainment Weekly

|-
|2015
|Nicki Minaj
|Honorees
|
|}

VH1P Awards
The VH1P Awards are the first-ever awards presented by VH1 India to celebrate their 16th birthday, honoring the best moments of music and pop culture from the past sixteen years. Minaj has won three awards out of three nominations.

|-
|rowspan="3"|2021
|"Anaconda"
|Best 'Scandalize Your Parents' Song
|
|-
|"Roman's Revenge"
|Best Diss Track
|
|-
|"Super Bass"
|Best Pump Me Up Track
|
|}

Virgin Media Music Awards
The Virgin Media Music Awards were an online music awards show run by Virgin Media. Minaj has received two nominations.

|-
|2011
|Nicki Minaj & Rihanna
|Best Collaboration
|
|-
|2012
|"Starships"
|Best Video
|
|}

Webby Award
A Webby Award is an award for excellence on the Internet presented annually by The International Academy of Digital Arts and Sciences, a judging body composed of over two thousand industry experts and technology innovators. Minaj has received one nomination.

|-
|2016
|"Miley, what's good?"
|Gif of the Year
|
|}

World Music Awards
The World Music Awards is an international awards show founded in 1989 under the high patronage of Albert II, Prince of Monaco and is based in Monte Carlo. Minaj has received seventeen nominations.

|-
|rowspan="17"|2014
|"Beauty and a Beat"
|World's Best Video
|
|-
|rowspan="2"|"Freaks"
|World's Best Song
|
|-
|World's Best Video
|
|-
|rowspan="2"|"Give Me All Your Luvin'"
|World's Best Song
|
|-
|World's Best Video
|
|-
|rowspan="3"|Herself
|World's Best Entertainer of the Year
|
|-
|World's Best Female Artist
|
|-
|World's Best Live Act
|
|-
|rowspan="2"|"I'm Out"
|World's Best Song
|
|-
|World's Best Video
|
|-
|rowspan="2"|"Love More"
|World's Best Song
|
|-
|World's Best Video
|
|-
|Pink Friday: Roman Reloaded|World's Best Album
|
|-
|rowspan="2"|"Starships"
|World's Best Song
|
|-
|World's Best Video
|
|-
|rowspan="2"|"Turn Me On"
|World's Best Song
|
|-
|World's Best Video
|
|}

XXL Awards
The XXL Awards recognised the best in hip-hop in 2012. The nominees and winners were picked by the XXL staff, excluding the winners in the big five biggest categories which was determined by public vote. Minaj has received four nominations. In 2022 XXL announced Nicki Minaj as the winner of “The Peoples Champ”.

|-
|rowspan="2"|2013
|rowspan="2"|"Beauty and a Beat"
|Best Rapper/Non-Rapper Collaboration
|
|rowspan="2" style="text-align:center;"|
|-
|Best Rap Verse on a Justin Bieber Record
|
|-
| rowspan="2"| 2022
| rowspan="2"| Herself
| Female Rapper of the Year
|  
| rowspan="2" style="text-align:center;" | 
|-
| The Peoples Champ
| 
|-
|}

YouTube Music Awards
The YouTube Music Awards (commonly abbreviated as YTMA) is an awards show presented by YouTube to honor the best in the music video medium. Minaj has won one award out of three nominations.

|-
|rowspan="2"|2013
|"Beauty and a Beat"
|Video of the Year
|
|-
|rowspan="2"|Herself
|Artist of the Year
|
|-
|2015
|50 artists to watch
|
|}

Z Awards
The Z Awards were created by Z100, a commercial contemporary hit radio (CHR) radio broadcasting serving the New York metropolitan area. The votes are submitted by the listeners. The categories include year in music, pop culture, sleaze and others. Minaj has won two awards out of four nominations.

|-
|rowspan="3"|2011
|Pink Friday''
|Album of the Year
|
|-
|rowspan="2"|Herself
|Breakout Star of the Year
|
|-
|Best New Artist
|
|-
|2012
|Mariah Carey vs. Nicki Minaj
|Biggest Drama
|
|}

4Music Video Honours
4Music is a music and entertainment channel in the United Kingdom. They give awards to the best artists or music videos based on votes from the general public. Minaj has won two awards out of ten nominations.

|-
|rowspan="4"|2011
|Herself
|Best Girl
|
|-
|rowspan="2"|"Super Bass"
|Best Big Beat
|
|-
|Best Video
|
|-
|"Where Them Girls At"
|Best Big Beat
|
|-
|rowspan="6"|2012
|Herself
|Best Girl
|
|-
|rowspan="2"|"Starships"
|Best R&B/Dance
|
|-
|rowspan="4"|Best Video
|
|-
|"Give Me All Your Luvin'"(Madonna featuring Nicki Minaj and M.I.A.)
|
|-
|"Pound The Alarm"
|
|-
|"Turn Me On"(David Guetta featuring Nicki Minaj)
|
|-
|}

References

Awards
Lists of awards received by musician